Elections to Midlothian Council were held on 3 May 2007, the same day as the other Scottish local government elections and the Scottish Parliament general election. The election was the first one using six new wards created as a result of the Local Governance (Scotland) Act 2004. Each ward will elect three or four councillors using the single transferable vote system form of proportional representation. The new wards replace 18 single-member wards which used the plurality (first past the post) system of election.

Labour lost control of the council to no overall control, something which the party suffered in many other parts of Scotland.  However, they regained control in 2008 when Cllr Katie Moffat defected from the Liberal Democrats to Labour.  Overall, Labour lost six seats and the single independent lost their seat, with most going to the Scottish National Party as well as a single gain for the Liberal Democrats.

Election results

Ward results

Changes since 2007 election
† On 3 June 2008, Midlothian East Cllr Katie Moffat defected from the Liberal Democrats to the Labour Party.
†† On 29 March 2012, Bonnyrigg Cllr Jack Aitchison resigned from the Labour Party and now sits as an Independent.
††† On 5 April 2012, Dalkeith Cllr Alex Bennett formally resigned from the Council to secure his Local Government pension.

References

2007 Scottish local elections
2007